The State and Region Governments are the sub-cabinet of each states and regions of Myanmar. The Head of the state or region cabinet is Chief Minister. The Member of cabinet is Minister of the state or region. The cabinet is formed with Chief Minister, Ministers and State/Region Advocate. With the agreement of State and Regional Hluttaws, the President can set the number of ministries.

Executive Authority 
Not contradict with the provisions of the Constitution, the executive power of the Region or State Government by the Region or State Legislative Affairs extends. Moreover, under the federal law allows the Region or State Government extends into matters.

Government Office 
Region or State Administration Department position as chief secretary of the entity, the relevant Region or State Government. In addition, the Region or State Department of General Administration is also the office of the relevant Region or State Mission.

Cabinets

Regions 
Ayeyarwady Region Government
Bago Region Government
Magway Region Government
Mandalay Region Government
Sagaing Region Government
Tanintharyi Region Government
Yangon Region Government

States 
Kachin State Government
Kayah State Government
Kayin State Government
Chin State Government
Mon State Government
Rakhine State Government
Shan State Government

Heads 

The heads of the governments are chief ministers.

Logos

References 

 http://www.president-office.gov.mm/?q=cabinet/region-and-state-government
 http://www.president-office.gov.mm/?q=cabinet/region-and-state-government/id-10078
 http://www.president-office.gov.mm/?q=cabinet/region-and-state-government/id-10118
 http://www.president-office.gov.mm/?q=briefing-room/news/2017/02/24/id-11814
 http://www.mmtimes.com/index.php/national-news/19818-meet-your-chief-ministers.html
 http://www.president-office.gov.mm/?q=briefing-room/news/2018/01/19/id-13241

External links 

State and region governments of Myanmar
Regions and states of Myanmar